East Lake is a transit station in Atlanta and Decatur, Georgia, serving the Blue Line of the Metropolitan Atlanta Rapid Transit Authority (MARTA) rail system. It has a track in each direction serving an island platform. When the station entered service on June 30, 1979, the opening ceremony took place in the south parking lot.

This station is located mainly in the neighborhood of Kirkwood, but is named after East Lake Boulevard in neighboring Decatur, into which the east end of the station extends. The station also serves the Villages of East Lake and Oakhurst. There are two Zip car parking spaces in the north parking lot.

Connecting bus service is operated from the station to: The Village of East Lake , East Lake Golf Course , Clifton Springs Health Center, Georgia State University-Decatur, North Dekalb Mall, Ponce City Market and Kirkwood.

Green Line service, which currently terminates at Edgewood/Candler Park station, is expected to be extended to Avondale with stops at East Lake and Decatur when the platform at Bankhead is expanded to accommodate 8-car trains. This is being done to increase the levels of service on MARTA's East-West trunk line.

Station layout

Buses at this station
The station is served by the following MARTA bus routes:
 Route 2 - Ponce De Leon Avenue / Druid Hills
 Route 34 - 2nd Avenue / Gresham Road / Clifton Springs Road
 Route 123 - Church Street / North DeKalb Mall

Nearby landmarks and popular destinations
Oakhurst
East Lake (Atlanta)
East Lake Golf Club

References

External links 

MARTA Station Page
nycsubway.org Atlanta page
East Lake Neighbors Community Association
East Lake Golf Club
Oakhurst Neighborhood Association
 Howard Avenue entrance from Google Maps Street View
 College Avenue entrance from Google Maps Street View
 City of Decatur Master Plan for East Lake Station (2018)

Blue Line (MARTA)
Metropolitan Atlanta Rapid Transit Authority stations
Railway stations in DeKalb County, Georgia
Railway stations in the United States opened in 1979
1979 establishments in Georgia (U.S. state)